Astrophytum ornatum, the bishop's cap or monk's hood cactus, is a flowering plant of the family Cactaceae, endemic to the Central Plateau of Mexico. It is the largest and tallest species of  Astrophytum.

Description
It develops numerous white woolly flakes for protection from the sun. It flowers throughout the summer, the flowers being 7 to 8 centimeters long in canary yellow.

Cultivation
It is a rugged plant resistant to root rot, and easy to grow in a well-drained soil. It is dark green when grown in filtered light or shade.

Astrophytum ornatum has gained the Royal Horticultural Society’s Award of Garden Merit.

References

External links
 
 Astrophytum ornatum on Astroweb 
  Astrophytum ornatum  on Astrobase 
 Simon & Schuster's Guide to Cacti and Succulents, Pizzetti, 
  photos on www.AIAPS.org 
 "Star Cactus (Astrophytum ornatum)".  
 photos on www.cactiguide.com 

ornatum
Cacti of Mexico
Endemic flora of Mexico
Flora of Central Mexico
Flora of Northeastern Mexico
Garden plants of North America